Ullasapoongattu is a 1997 Indian Malayalam-language romantic comedy film directed by Vinayan, and starring Dileep, Mohini, Kalabhavan Mani, Thilakan and Jagathy Sreekumar in major roles. Tini Tom sang a song in this film for Thilakan.

Plot
The film revolves around Unni, a cab driver, who tries to find a girl for John Fernandez, an American citizen who wishes to spend his holidays in Ootty. What he demands is just money which he needs to pay his family's debt. But he ends up falling in love with the young girl he finds.

Cast
 Dileep as Unni
 Mohini as Maya
 Kalabhavan Mani as Musthafa
 Thilakan as John Fernandez
 Jagathy Sreekumar as Vasuvannan
 Meghanathan as Kaliyappan
 Maniyanpilla Raju as Kuriyachan
 Kalpana as Marykkutti
 N. Sabnam as Kamakshi
 Oduvil Unnikrishnan as Thirumeni 
 Usha as Maya's Sister 
 Darshana as Maina
 M. Renjith as Police Officer

References

External links
 

1997 films
1990s Malayalam-language films
1997 romantic comedy films
Films directed by Vinayan
Indian romantic comedy films
Films scored by Berny–Ignatius